Paao is a figure from Hawaii. He is most likely a Hawaiian historical character retold through Hawaiian legend. According to Hawaiian tradition and folklore, he is said to have been a high priest from Kahiki, specifically "Wewaʻu" and "ʻUpolu." In Hawaiian prose and chant, the term "Kahiki" is applied in reference to any land outside of Hawaii, although the linguistic root is conclusively derived from Tahiti. "Wewaʻu" and "Upolu" point to actual places in the Society Islands, Samoa, and Hawaiian scholars and royal commentators consistently claim Paao came from Samoa; he was a Samoan priest with properties in both Tonga and Samoa. He arrived on the north shores of the Big Island and named it "Upolu" after Samoa main village (also known as "Western Samoa").

Scholars of Hawaiian lore including David Malo, Samuel M. Kamakau, John Papa ʻĪʻī, Solomon Peleioholani, Teuira Henry, and Stephen L. Desha support the notion that Pili and Pa'ao immigrated from the Society Islands of Samoa.

King Kalākaua, in his Legends and Myths of Hawai'i, theorized that the lineage of "Tahitian" chiefs and their aristocrats and priests descended from Samoa (i.e. Paao and Pilikaaiea). Accounts recorded by custodians of Hawaiian lore such as Mary Kawena Pukui, Abraham Fornander, and Kanuikaikaina argue that Pili and Pa'ao both came from the islands known today as Samoa. ʻUpolu (ʻUporu) is one of the main islands of Samoa; and Vavaʻu (Wewaʻu) is the northern group of Tongan islands, which are geographically closer to Samoa than to Tongatapu, and were linguistically and politically closer to Samoa in the past.

Legends suggest that Paao introduced certain customs (such as human sacrifice, primary worship of the god Kū, red feathered girdles "Kāʻei", Kāʻeke drums and veneration of the bonito fish) to Hawaii. He is also said to have brought a "pure" chief to rule over Hawai'i Island, deposing the tyrant and highest ranking chief, Kapawā. 

At this time in Hawai'i's history, the four island kingdoms were Kauaʻi (Kauaʻi and Niʻihau), Oʻahu, Maui (Maui, Molokaʻi, Lānaʻi, and Kaho'olawe), and Hawai'i. After the overthrow by Pāʻao and Pili, Kapawā fled to the Island Kingdom of Maui where his royal relatives, through the ancient ʻUlu bloodlines, provided him with shelter and protection. The two bloodlines between Hawai'i (Pili) and Maui (ʻUlu) would often go to war, with Maui usually remaining victorious. It wasn't until the time of King Kamehameha the Great, who was a direct descendant of Pili, that Hawai'i fully conquered the kingdom of Maui. Having done so, Kamehameha was able to complete his conquests, bringing about the unification of the Hawaiian islands under one rule.

Documented history of the story of Paao

The Paao story makes its first documented historical appearance in 1835–1836, in a collection of Hawaiian traditions called Moolelo Hawaii assembled by Hawaiian students of Lahainaluna High School, on the Hawaiian island of Maui. This collection was the basis of Sheldon Dibble's 1838 history of Hawaii. David Malo was one of the Lahainaluna students active in collecting oral traditions. He continued collecting legends and when he died in 1854, he had completed an unpublished manuscript that was finally translated to English and published in 1898.

Martha Beckwith, in her Hawaiian Mythology (1940, as republished in 1970), notes these historical sources:

 Emerson, Nathaniel – "The Long Voyages of the Ancient Hawaiians,"  Hawaiian Historical Society Papers Vol. 5, 1893, pp. 5–13
 Malo, David – Hawaiian Antiquities, as translated by Emerson, 1951 edition, pp. 6–7
 Green, Laura – Folktales from Hawaii, Honolulu, 1928, pp. 120–124
 Kamakau, Samuel M. – article in the Hawaiian newspaper Kuokoa, December 29, 1866
 Thrum, Thomas G. – More Hawaiian Folk Tales, Chicago, 1923, pp. 46–52
 Remy, Jules M. as translated by Brigham – Contributions of a Venerable Savage to the Ancient History of the Hawaiian Islands, Boston, 1868, pp. 10–11
 Westervelt, William D. – Hawaiian Historical Legends, New York, 1923, pp. 65–78
 Kalakaua, David – The Legends and Myths of Hawai'i, New York, 1888, pp. 47–48
 Stokes, John – "Whence Paao?" Hawaiian Historical Society Papers Vol. 15, Honolulu 1928, pp. 40–45

The Paao story also survives in various oral traditions passed down through Native Hawaiian families. Some Hawaiians insist on the purity and reliability of these traditions, but academic scholars believe that much from these traditions have been shaped by easily available published versions of the narrative.

However, there is no reason to doubt that the Paao story was widespread in pre-contact times. A lineage of Hawaiian high priests claimed descent from Paao, and Hawaiian high chiefs from the Big Island of Hawaiʻi traced their genealogies to Pili-kaaiea (Pili), the "pure" chief brought by Paao. Paao is said to have introduced human sacrifice, the walled heiau, the red feather girdle, the puloulou kapu sign, the prostrating kapu, the veneration of aku fish, and the feather god Tairi. The Paao narrative justified and sanctioned the social order as it then existed.

Narrative as found in Malo
We are informed (by historical tradition) that two men named Paʻao and Makua-kaumana, with a company of others, voyaged hither, observing the stars as a compass; and that Paʻao remained in Kohala, while Makua-Kaumana returned to Tahiti. Paʻao arrived at Hawaiʻi during the reign of Lono-ka-wai, the king of Hawaiʻi. He (Lono-ka-wai) was the sixteenth in that line of kings, succeeding Kapawa. Paʻao continued to live in Kohala until the kings of Hawaiʻi became degraded and corrupted (hewa); then he sailed away to Tahiti to fetch a king from thence. Pili (Kaʻaiea) was that king and he became one in Hawaiʻi's line of kings (papa aliʻi).
–David Malo, Hawaiian Antiquities, 1951 edition, p. 6.

Narrative in greater detail
The main outlines of the story follow. Many details vary from version to version. In one version told by British missionary William Ellis in 1826 Paao was a Caucasian chief.

Paao is said to have been a priest and a master navigator. He lived on a distant island called Kahiki in the oldest versions, and identified as either Tahiti or Samoa by believers in the historicity of the narrative.

His older brother, Lonopele, was the chief priest in some versions of the story, or the ruler of the island in others. Lonopele accused Paao's son of removing some kapu fish from the royal fishpond, or with stealing fruit. Paao was angry at his brother's persecution and in his anger, he killed his own son and ripped open the corpse's stomach, showing that there were no remnants of kapu fish or of fruit, in another version these partially digested foods were found.

Paao brooded over his misfortunes and decided to migrate to a distant land, far from his brother. He readied three large canoes for the voyage. He placed a kapu over the boats; no one was to touch the canoes without his permission. One evening, Paao discovered his nephew, the son of Lonopele, touching one of the sacred canoes. Paao killed his nephew and buried him in the sand under one of the canoes, which was elevated on blocks. Flies buzzed around the decomposing corpse, so the canoe was named Ka-nalo-a-muia, "the buzzing of flies."

Paao hurriedly assembled his retainers, launched the voyaging canoes, and departed. He left in such a hurry that one of his followers, an aged priest or prophet named Makuakaumana, was left behind. Makuakaumana climbed a cliff and called out to Paao; Paao refused to stop, saying that the canoes were full, all save the projection of the stern. Makuakaumana leapt from the cliff and gained his position in the canoe.

Paao sailed by the stars until they reached the Big Island of Hawaii. They landed in Puna, where Paao built the stone temple platform, or heiau, of Aha-ula, or Red Mouth. This was the first luakini heiau in Hawaii, the first heiau where human sacrifices were offered. He is also said to have landed in Kohala, on the opposite side of the island, and built the famous heiau of Mo'okini.

Paao believed that the chiefs of Hawaii had become hewa, or degraded, by indiscriminate intermarriage with lesser chiefs and commoners. He is said to have returned to his home island to fetch a chief of impeccable ancestry. He asked Lono-ka-eho, or Lono, who refused, and then recruited Pili-kaaiea, or Pili. Paao and Pili, along with Piliʻs sister Hina-au-kekele, chiefs and warriors, and their families, returned to Hawaii, where Pili became the new high chief.

Lineages of Paao and Pili
All the succeeding chiefs of the island claimed descent from the legendary Pili. Paao's descendants became priests, and their line or order, called Holae, continued into historical times. The last high priest, Hewahewa, who acquiesced to Christianity and the breaking of the kapus or ʻAi Noa in 1819, claimed descent from Paao.

Historicity
Until fairly recently, Hawaiian historians relied primarily on recorded oral history and comparative linguistics and ethnology. The "two migrations" theory was widely accepted. That is, in a first migration, Polynesians (specifically, Marquesans) settled the Hawaiian islands. In the second migration, Tahitians came north, conquered the original settlers, and established stratified chiefdoms.

Hawaiian archaeology then came into its own and sought material evidence for two migrations. Evidence is found of migrations that originated from the S. China Sea - Lapita (Kirsch, 1999). Then later, followed by migrations that originated from the E. Pacific i.e. Galapagos and Easter Island, which traversed a mostly submerged archipelago pathway leading directly into Tahiti. Thor Heyerdahl theorized that Polynesians originated from S. America and drifted to Hawai'i by luck, but his ethnocentric thought processes was debunked chiefly by Polynesian Voyaging Society, who showed that non-instrumental navigation was practical. However, there is some evidence that supported Heyerdahl's incorrect theory: Sweet potato and coconut originated from the E. Pacific.  These along with sugar cane, that originated in India, are among several Hawaiian crops that are now termed "canoe plants"; they were extremely important to voyaging way-finders i.e. Paao, who migrated to Hawaii. Furthermore, war implements of S. America, which were not typical in the W. Pacific, strongly resembled the Hawaiian ihe (spear), mahiole (war helmet) and ahaula (cape of royalty).  

Many Native Hawaiians and scholars who have studied the narratives believe the Paao narrative contains elements of actual history, and reflects a literal wave of migration from the south. The Polynesian Voyaging Society's undertakings, such as Hōkūleʻa canoe's voyages, indicate the feasibility of long voyages in ancient Polynesian canoes and the reliability of celestial navigation; these demonstrations show that the types of voyaging mentioned in the Pa'ao stories were indeed feasible, but the recreated voyages do little to prove the authenticity of the Pa'ao legends.

Hawaiian attitudes towards the high chiefs have changed; the ancient high chiefs are often seen today as oppressors, invaders who descended upon a peaceful and egalitarian Hawaiian population.  Activists praise these pre-Paao days as the real Hawaiian past, to be revived and reenacted in the present, and vilify Paao as a source of Hawaiian problems.  In this version, all the problems faced by Native Hawaiians can be traced to foreign interference.

See also
 Ancient Hawaii

References

Sources
 Malo, David, Hawaiian Antiquities, as translated by Emerson, 1951 edition, Bishop Museum Press
 Beckwith, Martha; Hawaiian Mythology, 1940, as republished in 1970, University of Hawaii Press

External links
 A retelling of the story
 Polynesian migration theories
 Pa'ao as invader
 Paao from Samoa
 Paao Tagaloa

Hawaiian legends
Hawaiiana